Faiyum Governorate is one of the governorates of Egypt in the middle of the country. Its capital is the city of Faiyum, located about 81 mi (130 km) south west of Cairo. It has a population of 3,848,708 (2020).

Etymology
 
The name Faiyum comes from Coptic  / efiom/peiom (whence the proper name  ), meaning the Sea or the Lake, which in turn comes from late Egyptian pA y-m of the same meaning, a reference to the nearby Lake Moeris.

Overview
The rate of poverty is more than 60% in this governorate but recently some social safety networks have been provided in the form of financial assistance and job opportunities. The funding has been coordinated by the country's Ministry of Finance and with assistance from international organizations.

Municipal divisions
The governorate is divided into the following municipal divisions for administrative purposes, with a total estimated population as of July 2017 of 3,615,486. In some instances there is a markaz and a kism with the same name.

Geography

The governorate of Faiyum includes:
 The large fertile Faiyum Oasis, which comprises farmland, Lake Moeris, and some cities.
 South of the Faiyum Oasis, a smaller depression contains the town of El Gharaq el Sulţāni. It is also irrigated from the Nile.
 A dry barren depression named Wadi El Rayan, which covers 280 mi² (725 km²), west of the El Gharaq el Sulţāni depression.
 Desert and dry mountains, which mostly surround the depressions.

Population

According to population estimates from 2015 the majority of residents in the governorate live in rural areas, with an urbanization rate of only 22.5%. Out of an estimated 3,170,150 people residing in the governorate, 2,456,368 people lived in rural areas and only 713,782 lived in urban areas.

Industrial zones
According to the Egyptian Governing Authority for Investment and Free Zones (GAFI), in affiliation with the Ministry of Investment (MOI), the following industrial zones are located in this governorate:
Kom Oshim 
New Kom Oshim
Kouta 
(New urban community industrial zone) New Fayoum

Notable people

Aly Lotfy Mahmoud
Ahmed Fakhry
Arafa El Sayed
Fawzia Fahim
Hamdi Abu Golayyel
Pope John XVIII of Alexandria
Magdy Atwa
Mariam Fakhr Eddine
Mohamed Abdelwahab
Mohamed Ihab
Saadia Gaon
Sayed Abdel Hafeez
Sayed Moawad
Sabri Raheel
Sufi Abu Taleb
Tefta Tashko-Koço
Youssef Wahbi
Yousef Wali
Zakariyya Ahmad

See also
Bahr Yussef
Egyptian Faiyumi 
 Fayum mummy portraits are paintings from the 1st century BC to the 3rd century AD.

References

External links
 El Wattan News of Faiyum Governorate 

 
Governorates of Egypt